
Gmina Maków Podhalański is an urban-rural gmina (administrative district) in Sucha County, Lesser Poland Voivodeship, in southern Poland.

Villages
Apart from the town of Maków Podhalański, Gmina Maków Podhalański contains the villages and settlements of Białka, Grzechynia, Juszczyn, Kojszówka, Wieprzec and Żarnówka.

Neighbouring gminas
Gmina Maków Podhalański is bordered by the town of Sucha Beskidzka and by the gminas of Budzów, Bystra-Sidzina, Jordanów, Stryszawa, Tokarnia, Zawoja and Zembrzyce.

References
Polish official population figures 2006

Makow Podhalanski
Sucha County